Richard Alexander is a British actor.

Early life
Alexander was born in Wibsey, Bradford in the UK and went to both the first school and middle school (as Richard Milnes) in the area Buttershaw where the feature film directed by Alan Clarke, Rita, Sue and Bob Too was filmed (although he never attended the upper school). At age 13 he attended Hipperholme Grammar School, where he shared the same class, and subsequently became acquainted with, Danny McNamara of Embrace - even recently directing and producing the promo video for their last single "Wake Up Call".  Later on he studied under the Electrical Engineering Department at the University of Bradford in conjunction with the National Media Museum (formerly the National Museum of Photography, Film and Television) achieving a BSc (Hons) in 'Electronic Imaging & Media Communications'.

Television
Over the past few years, Alexander has appeared in various programmes on both terrestrial and satellite TV. At present, he is featured on a show called BRAZEN; an eclectic mix of professionally shot reality TV, and more amateur-style footage, along with animated satire and parody. The animations featured in the show are aimed at deriding reality TV, whilst the live-action footage purports to promote the concept. Another show, called Rubbernecker (broadcast on Nuts TV in the UK) features him as the narrator/host.

Alexander is well known for his work with Men and Motors, a digital channel in the UK operated by ITV plc, having appeared in over 150 shows on their channel in the last 5 years. His first appearance was on his own creation, a reality clubbing show called UK Uncovered in which he and other presenters interviewed everyday people in the environment or nightclubs. This simple formula was relatively successful, which resulted in a further three more series of the same show, culminating recently with a version incorporating Nuts magazines' search for a new model, listed as "UK Uncovered vs The Nuts Babe Search".  This latest incarnation mirrors a technique first used in BRAZEN, specifically where the show's voiceover is done by a computer-generated personality but according to feedback found in various sources, this unique approach is not always popular with viewers.

He also hosted a current affairs show for a younger audience on ITV1, called Late Attitude. He has also produced several other series, such as The Steam Room, Bak2Skool, and he appeared in a mockumentary TV series entitled The Randomball Run.

Other work
Alexander worked on a (relatively) low-budget digital project between 1997 and 2000, which was to be distributed internationally but the deal was held up by complications, at which point he left the otherwise-completed project to pursue his TV ambitions. He was director of photography, film editor and assistant producer on the feature length film, at the time titled Fluffy Little Bunnies – later re-titled Bad Day which went on to win 'Best of the Fest' at ReelHeArt International Film Festival. Alexander was also featured heavily in a documentary on Discovery Health, UK called Who's the Daddy, a one-hour film following people trying to track down their biological fathers, which endured some national criticism for the way paternity tests were handled.

Personal life
He is related to J B Priestley, who is his mother's great uncle and by strange coincidence there is a statue of him (Priestley) outside the National Media Museum where Alexander studied media.

Filmography
UK Uncovered vs. The Nuts Babe Search  (2008) TV series – Producer/Host
RUBBERNECKER (2008) TV series – Producer/Writer/Voice
BRAZEN (2008) TV series – Producer/Host/Writer/Voice
The "C" Word (2007) documentary – Producer/Director
The Steam Room: with Michelle Marsh (2007) TV Series – Co-Host/Producer
Bak2Skool (2006) TV Series – Master Bates
UK Uncovered : Full On (2005) TV Series – Host/Producer
The Randomball Run 2004 (2004) TV Series – Himself
The Steam Room: with Jo Guest (2004) TV Series – Narrator/Producer
Who's the Daddy? (2004) documentary – Himself
UK Uncovered 2 (2004) TV Series – Host/Producer
Late Attitude (2004) TV Series – Host
Summer Party (2003) TV Series – Host
UK Uncovered (2002) TV Series – Host/Producer

References

External links

BRAZEN Official website
UK Uncovered Official website
Men & Motors website

Year of birth missing (living people)
Living people
People from Wibsey
Male actors from Bradford
Alumni of the University of Bradford
English male television actors
People educated at Hipperholme Grammar School